Sportklub Rapid Wien, commonly known as Rapid Vienna, is an Austrian football club playing in the country's capital city of Vienna. Rapid has won the most Austrian championship titles (32), including the first title in the season 1911–12, as well as a German championship in 1941 during Nazi rule. Rapid twice reached the final of the European Cup Winners' Cup in 1985 and 1996, losing on both occasions. 
The club is often known as Die Grün-Weißen (The Green-Whites) for its team colours or as Hütteldorfer, in reference to the location of the Gerhard Hanappi Stadium, which is in Hütteldorf, part of the city's 14th district in Penzing.

History

The club was founded in 1897 as Erster Wiener Arbeiter-Fußball-Club (First Viennese Workers' Football Club). The team's original colours were red and blue, which are still often used in away matches. In 1904, the team colours were changed to green and white. The club won Austria's first ever national championship in 1911–12 by a single point, and retained the title the following season.

Between World Wars
Rapid became a dominant force during the years between the world wars, an era in which Austria was one of the leading football nations on the continent. It won its first hat-trick of titles from 1919 to 1921. After the annexation of Austria to Germany in 1938, Rapid joined the German football system, playing in the regional first division Gauliga Ostmark along with clubs such as Wacker Wien and Admira Vienna. Rapid would be the most successful of these clubs. They won the Tschammerpokal, predecessor of today's DFB-Pokal, in 1938 with a 3–1 victory over FSV Frankfurt, and followed that with a German Championship in 1941 by defeating Schalke 04, the most dominant German club of the era. The team was able to overcome a 3–0 Schalke lead to win the match 4–3.

Post-World War II
As the winners of the 1954–55 season, Rapid were Austria's entrant for the inaugural European Cup in the following season. They were drawn in the first round against PSV and opened with a 6–1 home victory, with Alfred Körner scoring a hat-trick. Despite losing the away leg 1–0, the club still advanced to a quarter-final, where they started with a 1–1 home draw against Milan before being defeated 7–2 in the away match at the San Siro to lose 8–3 on aggregate.

Rapid's best performance in the European Cup came in the 1960–61 season when they reached the semi-final before being eliminated by eventual winners Benfica, 4–1 on aggregate. Previously, in the quarter-final the club required a replay to eliminate East German club Aue from the tournament after a 3–3 aggregate draw.

The club was involved in a controversial episode in 1984 when they eliminated Celtic from the last 16 of the European Cup Winners' Cup. Celtic were leading 4–3 on aggregate with 14 minutes left in the match when Rapid conceded a penalty. As the Rapid players protested to the match officials, their defender Rudolf Weinhofer then fell to the ground and claimed to have been hit by a bottle thrown from the stands. However, television images clearly showed that a bottle was thrown onto the pitch and did not hit Weinhofer. The match finished 4–3, but Rapid appealed to UEFA for a replay, and both teams were fined. The replay appeal was turned down initially, but Rapid appealed for a second time. On this occasion, Rapid's fine was doubled but UEFA also stipulated the match be replayed  from Celtic's ground. The game was held on 12 December 1984 at Old Trafford, Manchester, and Rapid won 1–0 through a Peter Pacult strike.

Rapid reached its first European final in 1985, losing 3–1 in the Cup Winners' Cup Final to Everton in Rotterdam. Eleven years later, in the same tournament's final in Brussels, Rapid lost 1–0 to Paris Saint-Germain.

Rapid last reached the group stage of the UEFA Champions League in 2005–06 after beating F91 Dudelange of Luxembourg 9–3 on aggregate and then defeating Lokomotiv Moscow 2–1 on aggregate in a play-off after a 1–0 victory in Russia. They eventually finished last in their group after losing all of their matches against Bayern Munich, Juventus and Club Brugge.

In 2015, the Rapid youth team took part in the third season of the Football for Friendship international children's social program, the final events of which were held in Berlin.

Club culture

Rapid Viertelstunde
Almost since the club's beginnings, Rapid fans have announced the last 15 minutes of the match by way of the traditional "Rapid-Viertelstunde" – rhythmic clapping at home or away regardless of the score. The first mention of the practice goes back to 1913, and on 21 April 1918 a newspaper wrote about the fans clapping at the beginning of the "Rapid-Viertelstunde". Over the decades, there have been many instances where the team managed to turn around a losing position by not giving up and, with their fans' support, fighting their way to a win just before the final whistle.

Fans

The biggest fan club is Ultras Rapid, which was founded in 1988. Other important fan clubs are the ultras group Tornados Rapid and Spirits Rapid and the hooligan firm Alte Garde Dritte Halbzeit.

The active supporters are situated in the Block West stand, which has a capacity of 8,500 spectators. The old Block West in the now demolished Gerhard-Hanappi-Stadion had about 2,700 seats.

The fan-base of Rapid is connected, in a friendly way, with the supporters of the German club Nürnberg, the Croatian club Dinamo Zagreb, the Italian club Venezia, the Hungarian club Ferencváros and the Greek club Panathinaikos. As Rapid, Ferencváros and Panathinaikos also play in green the alliance is nicknamed the "Green Brothers"

Stadium

Rapid played at the Gerhard Hanappi Stadium - which was opened on 10 May 1977 with a Wiener derby match against Austria Wien - until the 2013–14 season. The stadium bore the name of its architect Gerhard Hanappi, who also played for Rapid from 1950 to 1965. Prior to 1980, when it was renamed in his honour, it was known as the Weststadion (Western Stadium), due to its geographical location in the city.

In June 2014, it was announced that a new stadium, the Allianz Stadion, will be built in place of the old Gerhard Hanappi Stadium. During its construction, Rapid played its home games in the Ernst Happel Stadion.

Wiener Derby

Rapid Wien contest the Wien derby with their local Vienna rival FK Austria Wien. The two clubs are amongst the most supported and successful football teams in the entire country, and are the only Austrian clubs to have never been relegated. Both teams originate from Hietzing, the 13th district in the west of the city, but have since moved into different districts. While Austria Wien is seen as a middle-class club, Rapid traditionally hold the support of the capital's working class. The two clubs first met in a league championship match on 8 September 1911, a 4–1 victory for Rapid. The fixture is the most-played derby in European football after the Old Firm in Glasgow between Rangers and Celtic.

Honours

Domestic

Rapid Wien is Austria's record titleholder, lifting the trophy a total of 32 times, and the club also won a German Championship and German Cup while part of that country's football competition from 1938 to 1945 following the annexation of Austria by Nazi Germany on 12 March 1938.

Austrian Championship
Champions (32): 1911–12, 1912–13, 1915–16, 1916–17, 1918–19, 1919–20, 1920–21, 1922–23, 1928–29, 1929–30, 1934–35, 1937–38, 1939–40, 1940–41, 1945–46, 1947–48, 1950–51, 1951–52, 1953–54, 1955–56, 1956–57, 1959–60, 1963–64, 1966–67, 1967–68, 1981–82, 1982–83, 1986–87, 1987–88, 1995–96, 2004–05, 2007–08

Austrian Cup
Champions (14): 1918–19, 1919–20, 1926–27, 1945–46, 1960–61, 1967–68, 1968–69, 1971–72, 1975–76, 1982–83, 1983–84, 1984–85, 1986–87, 1994–95

Austrian Supercup
Champions (3): 1986, 1987, 1988

German Championship
Champions: 1941

German Cup
Champions: 1938

Continental
 Mitropa Cup:
Champions (2): 1930, 1951

Cup Winners' Cup
Runners-up: 1984–85, 1995–96

Current squad

Notable former players
Albania
  Hamdi Salihi
Argentina
  Hugo Maradona
Austria
  Andreas Ivanschitz
  Robert Körner
  György Garics
  Erwin Hoffer
  Ümit Korkmaz
  Louis Schaub
  Florian Kainz
  Andi Herzog
  Roman Wallner
Belgium
  Boli Bolingoli-Mbombo
  Axel Lawarée
Belarus
  Alyaksandr Myatlitski
Brazil
  Joelinton
Bulgaria
  Trifon Ivanov
Canada
  Ante Jazić
Cameroon
  Samuel Ipoua
Costa Rica
  Hernán Medford
Croatia
  Mario Bazina
  Nikica Jelavić
  Zlatko Kranjčar
Czechia
  Radek Bejbl
  Marek Kincl
  Ladislav Maier
  Antonín Panenka
  René Wagner
Denmark
  Johnny Bjerregaard
Finland
  Markus Heikkinen
Georgia
  Giorgi Kvilitaia
Germany
  Jens Dowe
  Oliver Freund
  Steffen Hofmann
  Carsten Jancker
  Marcel Ketelaer
  Gerhard Poschner
  Angelo Vier
Greece
  Taxiarchis Fountas 
  Thanos Petsos 
Hungary
  Attila Szalai 
Iran
  Farhad Majidi
  Mehdi Pashazadeh
Iceland
  Arnór Ingvi Traustason
Kosovo
  Atdhe Nuhiu 
Montenegro
  Branko Bošković
  Dejan Savićević 
Netherlands
  Jan Vennegoor of Hesselink
  Gaston Taument
Norway
  Veton Berisha
  Jan Åge Fjørtoft
Poland
  Andrzej Kubica
  Andrzej Lesiak
  Krzysztof Ratajczyk
  Maciej Śliwowski
Slovakia
  Peter Hlinka
  Ján Novota
  Marek Penksa
  Jozef Valachovič
Slovenia
  Robert Berić
Soviet Union
  Anatoli Zinchenko
Tajikistan
  Sergei Mandreko
Turkey
  Mert Müldür
United States
  Terrence Boyd
Yugoslavia
  Petar Bručić
  Zoran Stojadinović

Club staff

Coaching history

  Dionys Schönecker (1910–25)
  Stanley Wilmott (1925–26)
  Edi Bauer (1926–36)
  Leopold Nitsch (1936–45)
  Hans Pesser (1 July 1945 – 28 February 1953)
  Josef Uridil (1953–54)
  Viktor Hierländer (1954–55)
  Leopold Gernhardt (1955)
  Franz Wagner (1955)
  Alois Beranek (1956)
  Franz Wagner (1956)
  Max Merkel (1 July 1956 – 30 June 1958)
  Rudolf Kumhofer (1958–59)
  Robert Körner (1 July 1959 – 30 June 1966)
  Rudolf Vytlacil (1 July 1966–68)
  Karl Decker (1968–70)
  Rudolf Vytlacil (1968 – 30 April 1969)
  Karl Rappan (1969–70)
  Gerd Springer (1970–72)
  Robert Körner (1972)
  Ernst Hlozek (1 April 1972 – 22 April 1975)
  Josef Pecanka (1975)
  F. Binder /  R. Körner (1 September 1975 – 30 June 1976)
  Antoni Brzezanczyk (1976–77)
  Robert Körner (1977)
  Karl Schlechta (1978–79)
  Walter Skocik (1 July 1979 – 1 April 1982)
  Rudolf Nuske (1982)
  Otto Barić (1 July 1982 – 30 June 1985)
  Vlatko Marković (1 July 1985 – 30 June 1986)
  Otto Barić (1 July 1986 – 11 September 1988)
  Wilhelm Kaipel (interim) (12 September 1988 – 19 September 1988)
  Vlatko Marković (19 September 1988 – 30 June 1989)
  Hans Krankl (1 July 1989 – 30 June 1992)
  August Starek (1 July 1992 – 31 May 1993)
  Hubert Baumgartner (1 July 1993 – 22 May 1994)
  Ernst Dokupil (23 May 1994 – 1 April 1998)
  Heribert Weber (1 April 1998 – 1 May 2000)
  Ernst Dokupil (1 July 2000 – 18 August 2001)
  Peter Persidis (interim) (18 Aug 2001 – 5 September 2001)
  Lothar Matthäus (6 September 2001 – 10 May 2002)
  Josef Hickersberger (1 July 2002 – 31 December 2005)
  Georg Zellhofer (1 Jan 2006 – 27 August 2006)
  Peter Pacult (5 September 2006 – 11 April 2011)
  Zoran Barisic (interim) (11 April 2011 – 30 May 2011)
  Peter Schöttel (1 June 2011 – 17 April 2013)
  Zoran Barisic (17 April 2013 – 6 June 2016)
  Mike Büskens (7 June 2016 – 7 November 2016)
  Damir Canadi (11 November 2016 – 8 April 2017)
  Goran Djuricin (9 April 2017 – 29 September 2018)
  Dietmar Kühbauer (1 October 2018 – 10 November 2021)
  Steffen Hofmann (interim) (11 November 2021 – 28 November 2021)
  Ferdinand Feldhofer (29 November 2021 – 15 October 2022)
  Zoran Barisic (16 October 2022 – June 2025)

See also

List of SK Rapid Wien records and statistics

References

External links

 Rapid at UEFA.com
 Rapid at EUFO.de
 Rapid at Weltfussball.de

 
Association football clubs established in 1899
Rapid Wien
Football clubs from former German territories
Fan-owned football clubs
1899 establishments in Austria
Rapid Wien